Buddy Shuman (September 8, 1915 – November 13, 1955) was a stock car driver who competed in the NASCAR Grand National Series.  He raced between 1951 until 1955, achieving one victory, four top 5s, and 16 top 10s.  Shuman is best known for winning his one and only race in 1952 at Stamford Park in Niagara Falls, Ontario, the first NASCAR Grand National Series race held in Canada.

Shuman died in a hotel fire the night before the start of the 1956 NASCAR Grand National campaign.  He had been tasked to head Ford's effort to succeed in NASCAR.

References

External links
 

1915 births
1955 deaths
Racing drivers from Charlotte, North Carolina
NASCAR drivers
Deaths from fire in the United States